James Noble Tyner (January 17, 1826 – December 5, 1904) was a lawyer, U.S. Representative and U.S. Postmaster-General from Indiana. Tyner was elected to the U.S. House of Representatives in 1869 serving three terms until 1875. While in the House, Tyner opposed granting railroad subsidies, promoted gradual western industrial expansion, and spoke out against Congressional franking privilege. In 1873, Tyner voted for the Salary Grab pay raise and bonus that prevented him from getting the fourth-term Republican Congressional nomination. President Ulysses S. Grant appointed Tyner Second Assistant Postmaster-General in 1875 then U.S. Postmaster-General in 1876 serving until 1877. Tyner served as Assistant Postmaster-General under President Rutherford B. Hayes until 1881. In October 1881 Tyner was forced to resign his Assistant Postmaster-General position by President Chester A. Arthur, for his assumed knowledge of Star Route postal frauds and for giving his son, whom Tyner had appointed Superintendent of the Chicago Post Office, a $1,000 salary increase. Afterwards, Tyner served as Assistant Attorney to the U.S. Post Office Department from 1889 to 1893 and from 1897 to 1903. Tyner was forced to resign his office of Assistant Attorney by Postmaster-General Henry C. Payne in April 1903, whereupon under investigation Tyner was indicted and put on trial for fraud and bribery charges. Tyner was acquitted from all charges for lack of evidence after his family controversially removed pertinent papers from his office safe. In poor health, Tyner died the following year. After a brief biographical article of Tyner in 1906, modern historical research on his life and career has been limited. Initially coming into Washington as a mid west Representative and reformer, Tyner's political career would be associated by controversy and scandal. He was the last surviving Grant cabinet who served in federal office into the 20th Century. Tyner, an expert in the Postal Service, was appointed and served as a delegate to the International Postal Congresses in 1878 and 1897, having the confidence of Republican Presidents Rutherford B. Hayes and William McKinley.

Early life and family

James Noble Tyner was born in Brookville, Indiana, on January 17, 1826.  Tyner came from a prominent Indiana family. Tyner was one of twelve children.  His father was Richard Tyner and his mother was Martha Sedgwick Willis Swift Noble. Tyner's grandfather, William E. Tyner, was a pioneer Baptist minister who preached in Eastern Indiana for many years.  Tyner's father Richard was a prominent Indiana business man. Tyner's mother Martha's brother was Indiana Governor Noah Noble serving from 1831 to 1837 and another one of her brothers was Indiana U.S. Senator James Noble serving from 1816 to 1831.  Tyner pursued an academic course and graduated from Brookville Academy in 1844.  From 1846 to 1854 Tyner was engaged and worked in his father's business. Tyner studied law and was admitted to the bar in 1857 commencing practice in Peru, Indiana.

Political career
From 1857 to 1861 Tyner was secretary of the Indiana State Senate. In 1860 Tyner served as presidential elector on the Abraham Lincoln and Hannibal Hamlin Republican ticket during the 1860 presidential election. From 1861 to 1866 Tyner was a special agent for the United States Post Office Department.  Although Tyner did not militarily serve during the Civil War his brother, Noah Noble Tyner, served bravely in the Union Army retiring with the rank of Lieutenant-Colonel.

U.S. Representative (1869-1875)

In 1869, Tyner was elected a Republican to the United States House of Representatives to fill the vacancy caused by the resignation of Representative-elect Daniel D. Pratt (who instead took a seat in the Senate).   Tyner represented the Indiana's 8th District during the 41st, 42nd, and 43rd U.S. Congresses.  At the time Tyner was elected the Republicans controlled both the House and the Senate. He was reelected in 1870 and 1872, serving from 1869 to 1875.   Tyner, considered a reformer his first two terms, gave few speeches in the House and was noted for his statistical accuracy and "sound reasoning". His vote for the unpopular Salary Grab in 1873 bill later cost him the Republican nomination in 1874.

Advocated repeal of franking privilege
U.S. Representative Tyner advocated the removal of the Franking Privilege in his first speech in the House on February 5, 1870. This allowed Congressmen to mail to their constituents free of charge. President Grant's Postmaster-General John Creswell also advocated the removal of the franking privilege.

Opposed railroad subsidies
Tyner spoke out against granting large land tract subsidies to the Northern Pacific Railroad.  Tyner believed that land between the Mississippi and the Pacific Ocean should be settled gradually over time giving settlers free land to build houses. Tyner considered America to be an empire and U.S. citizens had a right to settle the West. On May 16, 1870 Tyner stated in a speech to the House, "Much as we desire to see the country lying between the Mississippi and the Pacific teaming with an industrious population, it would be far better to reach that end by slow marches, than to rush into a policy that will eventually retard its prosperity and check its growth."

Voted for Salary Grab 

On March 3, 1873 President Grant on the last day of his first term in office having been elected for a second term signed into law a bill that increased the President's pay from $25,000 to $50,000 dollars and salaries in both the House and Senate were raised from $5,000 to $7,500 including a $5,000 bonus. Tyner voted for this pay increase and bonus, as a secret attachment to an appropriations bill, known as the Salary Grab. Although congressional and presidential pay raises were constitutional, reforming newspapers exposed the $5,000 bonus and the Congressmen who voted for the bill, later repealed in January 1874. Grant, however, retained the $50,000 a year presidential pay. The Salary Grab law was unpopular with the public and Tyner failed to receive the Republican Congressional nomination the same year.

Committees served on

 41st Congress (1869-1871) 
 House Education and Labor 7th-Majority
 House Post Office and Post Roads 6th-Majority.

 42nd Congress (1871-1873) 
House Post Office and Post Roads 4th-Majority Chairman 
House Public Buildings and Grounds 3rd-Majority.
Washington Monument Select 

43rd Congress (1873-1875)
House Appropriations 3rd-Majority.

Second assistant Postmaster-General (1875-1876)
President Ulysses S. Grant appointed Tyner Second Assistant Postmaster General serving from February 26, 1875, to July 12, 1876.

Postmaster General (1876-1877) 

On July 12, 1876, President Grant appointed Tyner Postmaster General serving until March 12, 1877. Tyner secured his old position of Second Assistant Postmaster-General to his fellow Indianan and Civil War general Thomas J. Brady appointed by President Grant. Brady would later be involved and associated with the Star Route postal scandal that was revealed after President James A. Garfield took office in 1881.

First assistant Postmaster-General (1877-1881)

After the end of the Grant administration, he was appointed to First Assistant Postmaster-General by President Rutherford B. Hayes, serving from 1877 until his resignation in October 1881. When President James A. Garfield  took office on March 4, 1881, there were rumors of fraud taking place in the postal department where corrupt contractors made excessive profits on Star Routes. President Garfield had ordered an investigation on the matter by his appointed Postmaster-General Thomas L. James.    Tyner was extremely familiar with the inner workings of the postal contract system and upon investigation by Postmaster-General James was assumed to have known and allowed postal contract profiteering. James ordered Tyner to resign office by July, but after Garfield was assassinated and incapacitated, Tyner refused to leave. Also involved in the Star Route frauds was Tyner's Indiana friend and Second Assistant Postmaster Thomas J. Brady. The investigation revealed that Tyner had given his son a lucrative job of $2,000 a year as Superintendent of the Chicago Post Office. When his son took the position Tyner had increased his salary from $1,000 to $2,000 dollars. When Garfield finally died on September 19 and his Vice President Chester A. Arthur took office, President Arthur finally forced Tyner to resign and vacate office on October 17, 1881.

Later career
On the evening of June 12, 1882 Tyner was seriously injured suffering a concussion and bruising on his face after being thrown from a buggy while riding near Brightwood. Tyner recovered after being taken to the city and his wounds were dressed.

Tyner was a delegate to the International Postal Congress in Paris, France, in 1878 and in Washington, D.C., in 1897. Tyner served as Assistant Attorney General of the Post Office Department from 1889 to 1893 and again from 1897 to 1903.

Post Office frauds and investigation (1903)

On March 7, 1903, President Theodore Roosevelt launched an investigation into frauds in the Post Office. Early in April, Postmaster-General Henry C. Payne informed Tyner who was under suspicion of corruption to resign office by a mutual friend. Tyner and Mrs. Tyner then pleaded with Payne to keep Tyner in office. Payne then postponed Tyner's resignation to May 1 and told Tyner he was suspended from duties as Assistant Attorney barring Tyner from his office. This left Tyner in a precarious position of technically being Assistant Attorney without administrative powers. Tyner instructed his wife to retrieve his official papers from the safe room in his Washington D.C. office on the fifth floor of the Postal Department. On Tuesday April 20 Mrs. Tyner arrived at Tyner's office at closing time 4 P.M. and was allowed to enter Tyner's office unsuspectedly alone. Tyner's wife then secretly let in her sister-in-law and a company safe man by another door who unlocked the safe, whereupon, Mrs. Tyner retrieved all of Tyner's official papers. Having bundled and packaged the papers Mrs. Tyner sent the papers by an African American messenger, who had also entered Tyner's office by another door, taking the papers to Tyner's residence. After her party had left by the other door, Mrs. Tyner then walked out of Tyner's office alone, and returned to Tyner's house. The head of the Post Office Bureau George Christiancy immediately discovered and informed Postmaster-General Payne of Mrs. Tyner taking Tyners papers from the safe. Payne sent two investigators to Tyner's house, but Tyner and his wife refused to give the investigators Tyner's papers nor allow the investigators into Tyner's residence.

On April 22, 1903 Assistant Attorney General Tyner was removed from office by Postmaster-General Payne. Four days later on April 26 Tyner and his wife denied any wrongdoing. Tyner stated that he had served his country faithfully and the officials at the Post Office had "lost their heads". Tyner stated he remained on as Assistant Attorney after March 9 to vindicate his honor. Mrs. Tyner stated that she and her husband had been labeled robbers by the Postal Department. Mrs. Tyner said that she had freely been allowed to go into Tyner's office room where the safe was located and nothing was done in secret. Mrs. Tyner said she returned papers in a box to the Postal Department that did not have any criminal evidence.

In mid-1903 Tyner was investigated for corruption in the Post Office by special prosecutor Charles J. Bonaparte and Fourth Assistant Postmaster General Joseph L. Bristow. Tyner was indicted three times for fraud and one count bribery. Also indicted was First Assistant Postmaster Perry S. Heath. President Roosevelt stated the postal investigation revealed a condition of "gross corruption" in their offices.   Allegations against Tyner and Heath ranged from gross negligence of office, criminal collusion, to actual participation in frauds, bribery, and financial profiteering.  Tyner was acquitted for lack of evidence since Tyner's wife had removed his papers from his office in April. Bristow's investigation resulted in 41 indictments against 31 persons connected to the postal frauds. Four postal officers and employees resigned while thirteen workers were removed from office.

Death
Tyner since July, 1902 had been suffering from paralysis and the postal investigation trial in 1904 had put a strain on his feebled health. He died in Washington, D.C., on December 5, 1904, and was interred there in Oak Hill Cemetery.

Historical reputation
Tyner was the only member of the Grant Administration cabinet to hold a federal office appointment in the 20th Century serving under President William McKinley and President Theodore Roosevelt. He has been relatively forgotten by historians after 1906 having not been mentioned in the 1936 Dictionary of American Biography edited by Dumas Malone. Elected three times to the House starting in 1869 Tyner was a successful mid western politician, however, he was not reelected in 1874 due to his vote for the controversial Salary Grab Act. His long career in the Post Office Department ended twice abruptly in 1881 and 1903 under suspicion of corruption. In 1903, Tyner and his wife's reputation were damaged after the controversy of taking official government documents from his office in Washington D.C. Tyner did not live long enough and was in feeble health to author and defend himself in a biography. Tyner was an expert on the inner workings of the Post Office during his lifetime having a history of working for the Postal Department starting in 1861.

Notes

Sources

External links

1826 births
1904 deaths
United States Postmasters General
Indiana lawyers
Burials at Oak Hill Cemetery (Washington, D.C.)
Grant administration cabinet members
Washington, D.C., Republicans
People from Brookville, Indiana
19th-century American politicians
Republican Party members of the United States House of Representatives from Indiana